Depth of focus is a lens optics concept that measures the tolerance of placement of the image plane (the film plane in a camera) in relation to the lens. In a camera, depth of focus indicates the tolerance of the film's displacement within the camera and is therefore sometimes referred to as "lens-to-film tolerance".

Depth of focus versus depth of field

The phrase depth of focus is sometimes erroneously used to refer to the depth of field (DOF), which is the area in front of the lens in acceptable focus, whereas the true meaning of depth of focus refers to the zone behind the lens wherein the film plane or sensor is placed to produce an in-focus image.

Depth of focus can have two slightly different meanings. The first is the distance over which the image plane can be displaced while a single object plane remains in acceptably sharp focus; the second is the image-side conjugate of depth of field. With the first meaning, the depth of focus is symmetrical about the image plane; with the second, the depth of focus is greater on the far side of the image plane, though in most cases the distances are approximately equal.

Where depth of field often can be measured in macroscopic units such as meters and feet, depth of focus is typically measured in microscopic units such as fractions of a millimeter or thousandths of an inch.

The same factors that determine depth of field also determine depth of focus, but these factors can have different effects than they have in depth of field. Both depth of field and depth of focus increase with smaller apertures. For distant subjects (beyond macro range), depth of focus is relatively insensitive to focal length and subject distance, for a fixed f-number. In the macro region, depth of focus increases with longer focal length or closer subject distance, while depth of field decreases.

Determining factors
In small-format cameras, the smaller circle of confusion limit yields a proportionately smaller depth of focus. In motion-picture cameras, different lens mount and camera gate combinations have exact flange focal distance measurements to which lenses are calibrated.

The choice to place gels or other filters behind the lens becomes a much more critical decision when dealing with smaller formats. Placement of items behind the lens will alter the optics pathway, shifting the focal plane. Therefore, often this insertion must be done in concert with stopping down the lens in order to compensate enough to make any shift negligible given a greater depth of focus. It is often advised in 35 mm motion-picture filmmaking not to use filters behind the lens if the lens is wider than 25 mm.

Calculation
If the depth of focus relates to a single plane in object space, it can be calculated from

where t is the total depth of focus, N is the lens f-number, c is the circle of confusion, v is the image distance, and f is the lens focal length. In most cases, the image distance (not to be confused with subject distance) is not easily determined; the depth of focus can also be given in terms of magnification m:

The magnification depends on the focal length and the subject distance, and sometimes it can be difficult to estimate. When the magnification is small, the formula simplifies to

The simple formula is often used as a guideline, as it is much easier to calculate, and in many cases, the difference from the exact formula is insignificant. Moreover, the simple formula will always err on the conservative side (i.e., depth of focus will always be greater than calculated).

Following historical convention, the circle of confusion is sometimes taken as the lens focal length divided by 1000 (with the result in same units as the focal length);
this formula makes most sense in the case of normal lens (as opposed to wide-angle or telephoto), where the focal length is a representation of the format size. This practice is now deprecated; it is more common to base the circle of confusion on the format size (for example, the diagonal divided by 1000 or 1500).

In astronomy, the depth of focus  is the amount of defocus that introduces a  wavefront error. It can be calculated as
.

References 

 Hart, Douglas C. 1996. The Camera Assistant: A Complete Professional Handbook. Newton, MA: Focal Press. 
 Hummel, Rob (editor). 2001. American Cinematographer Manual, 8th edition. Hollywood: ASC Press. 
 Larmore, Lewis. 1965. Introduction to Photographic Principles. 2nd ed. New York: Dover Publications, Inc.

 Lipson, Stephen G., Ariel Lipson, and Henry Lipson. 2010. Optical Physics. 4th ed. Cambridge: Cambridge University Press.  (scheduled release October 2010)
 
 Ray, Sidney F. 2000. The geometry of image formation. In The Manual of Photography: Photographic and Digital Imaging, 9th ed. Ed. Ralph E. Jacobson, Sidney F. Ray, Geoffrey G. Atteridge, and Norman R. Axford. Oxford: Focal Press. 

Geometrical optics
Science of photography